Lamèch is a small lunar impact crater that is located to the southwest of the prominent crater Eudoxus, at the eastern edge of the Montes Caucasus range. It was named after French selenographer Félix Chemla Lamèch. This is a circular, bowl-shaped formation. The inner walls slope down to a small central floor that is about one-fourth the diameter of the crater. This formation is not notably eroded, and contains no other features of interest.

References

 
 
 
 
 
 
 
 
 
 
 

Impact craters on the Moon